Music of the Millennium II (named Music of the Millennium 2001 for its Japanese release) is the second part of the Music of the Millennium trilogy. The album was released soon after the beginning of the third millennium, and has music from some of the most influential names in popular music from the middle to the end of the twentieth century and includes some of the biggest international hits of the period. Different versions of the album were released, including two international versions and a one-disc Canadian version.

International Track List 1

Disc 1 
Queen – Bohemian Rhapsody
The Rolling Stones – Undercover of the Night
Jimi Hendrix – Purple Haze
U2 – Pride (In the Name of Love)
Simple Minds – Alive and Kicking
Blondie – Call Me 
Lenny Kravitz – Fly Away 
Bryan Adams – Run to You
David Bowie – China Girl
Pink Floyd – Another Brick in the Wall (Part 2)
Sting – Englishman In New York
Elton John – Rocket Man 
Supertramp – Breakfast In America
Genesis – Invisible Touch
Eric Clapton – I Shot the Sheriff
Bob Marley & the Wailers – Jamming
UB40 with Chrissie Hynde – I Got You Babe
Deep Purple – Smoke on the Water
Oasis – Cigarettes & Alcohol
Blur – Song 2

Disc 2 
John Lennon – Woman
The Police – Every Breath You Take
Sinéad O'Connor – Nothing Compares 2 U
Janet Jackson – That's the Way Love Goes
George Michael – Fastlove
Robbie Williams – Angels
Tina Turner – What's Love Got to Do with It
Rod Stewart – You Wear It Well
Prince – 1999 
Donna Summer – Hot Stuff
ABBA – Mamma Mia
Diana Ross – Chain Reaction
James Brown – Get Up (I Feel Like Being a) Sex Machine
Marvin Gaye – What's Going On
Ben E. King – Stand by Me 
Otis Redding – (Sittin' on) the Dock of the Bay
Stevie Wonder – Uptight (Everything's Alright)
Simon & Garfunkel – Mrs. Robinson
Wings – Mull of Kintyre
Don McLean – American Pie

 Notice that in the UK the 40 songs are arranged in a different order.

International Track List 2

Disc 1 
Queen & David Bowie – Under Pressure 
Rolling Stones – Start Me Up 
U2 – Pride (In the Name of Love)
Eric Clapton – Bad Love 
Aerosmith – Love in an Elevator 
Free – All Right Now 
Paul McCartney & Wings –  Jet 
Dire Straits – Money for Nothing 
Peter Gabriel – Sledgehammer 
Simple Minds – Alive and Kicking
Frankie Goes to Hollywood – Relax 
Supertramp – The Logical Song 
Jethro Tull – "Living in the Past" 
Prince – Kiss 
Tina Turner – The Best 
Simon & Garfunkel – Mrs. Robinson 
Bob Dylan – Like a Rolling Stone 
The Byrds – Mr. Tambourine Man 
The Beach Boys – God Only Knows

Disc 2 
John Lennon – Woman
Robbie Williams – Angels 
Crowded House – Don't Dream It's Over 
Oasis – Don't Look Back in Anger 
Cranberries – Linger 
Radiohead – Paranoid Android 
Manic Street Preachers – If You Tolerate This Your Children Will Be Next 
Blur – Parklife 
The Smiths – How Soon Is Now? 
Elvis Costello – Oliver's Army 
Bryan Ferry & Roxy Music – Virginia Plain 
The Jam – Going Underground 
The Undertones – Teenage Kicks 
The Clash – London Calling 
The Prodigy – Firestarter 
Underworld – Born Slippy .NUXX 
Massive Attack – Protection 
Portishead – Glory Box 
David Bowie – Life on Mars?

Japanese Track List

Disc 1 
Queen – Bohemian Rhapsody
Eric Clapton – I Shot The Sheriff
Paul McCartney & Stevie Wonder – Ebony and Ivory
Jimi Hendrix – Purple Haze
Prince – 1999 
Bob Marley & the Wailers – Jamming
Sting – Englishman in New York
The Who – Pinball Wizard
Lenny Kravitz – Fly Away
Simon & Garfunkel – Mrs. Robinson
Janet Jackson – That's the Way Love Goes
Ben E. King – Stand by Me
Oasis – Cigarettes & Alcohol
Genesis – Invisible Touch
Marvin Gaye – Let's Get It On
Stevie Wonder – Uptight (Everything's Alright)
Tina Turner – What's Love Got to Do with It
Michael Jackson – Ben
Enigma – Return to Innocence
Pet Shop Boys – Go West

Disc 2 
John Lennon – Woman
The Rolling Stones – Miss You
The Police – Every Breath You Take
Pink Floyd – Another Brick in the Wall (Part II)
Elton John – Goodbye Yellow Brick Road
U2 – Pride (In the Name of Love)
David Bowie – Starman
ABBA – Chiquitita
The Jackson 5 – ABC
Freddie Mercury – I Was Born to Love You
Paul McCartney – My Love
Boyz II Men – I'll Make Love To You
Donna Summer – Hot Stuff
Robert Palmer – Addicted to Love
Diana Ross – Chain Reaction
Culture Club – Do You Really Want to Hurt Me
Otis Redding – (Sittin' on) the Dock of the Bay
James Brown – Get Up (I Feel Like Being a) Sex Machine
Blur – Song 2
UB40 – Can't Help Falling in Love

Canadian Track List
John Lennon – Woman 
Paul McCartney & Wings – Band on the Run 
The Who – My Generation 
Eric Clapton – Cocaine 
Jimi Hendrix – Purple Haze 
Pink Floyd – Another Brick in the Wall (Part 2) 
The Rolling Stones – Undercover of the Night 
Lenny Kravitz – Are You Gonna Go My Way
Steve Miller Band – The Joker  
U2 – Pride (In the Name of Love) 
Peter Gabriel – Shock the Monkey 
Kate Bush – Running Up that Hill 
Marvin Gaye – Sexual Healing 
Tina Turner – What's Love Got to Do with It 
James Brown – Get Up (I Feel Like Being a) Sex Machine 
UB40 with Chrissie Hynde – I Got You Babe

References

External links
 Music of the Millennium II – International Track List 1
 Music of the Millennium II – International Track List 1 front-and backcover
 [ Music of the Millennium II – International Track List 2]
 Music of the Millennium II – Canadian Track List

2000 compilation albums
2001 compilation albums
2002 compilation albums